The 1992 Italian Superturismo Championship was the sixth edition of the Italian Superturismo Championship. The season began in Monza on 21 March and finished on the same racetrack on 18 October, after ten rounds. Nicola Larini won the S1 Class (Group A cars), driving an Alfa Romeo 155 GTA, while Fabrizio Giovanardi won the S2 Class (Super Touring cars).

Teams and drivers

S1 Class

S2 Class

Race calendar and results

Notes:
   - Fabrizio Giovanardi and Filippo Salvarani were declared winners ex-aequo.

Championship standings
Scoring system

S1 Class

S2 Class

Notes:
   - Fabrizio Giovanardi and Filippo Salvarani were declared winners ex-aequo.
   - Fabrizio Giovanardi and Luigi Giorgio were disqualified from the second race of the first Monza round and their race-1 points were halved.

External links
1992 season on Touringcarracing.net

Italian Superturismo Championship